Salmon River is an unincorporated Canadian suburban community in central Nova Scotia's Colchester County.

A suburb of the town of Truro, Salmon River is located on the south side of the Salmon River, from which it derives its name.

The defining feature in the community is Canadian National Railway's Truro Yard, located in the river flood plain.  Newer suburban developments in Salmon River range up the hill along the south side of the valley.

Salmon River was the winning entrant in the nationwide 2006 Hockeyville contest.

Deuville Rink
A privately owned outdoor community skating rink was created by local resident Webb Deuville in 1958. The Deuville family subsequently upgraded and covered the rink with a structure in 1989, however in the mid 1990s the ice was still naturally frozen, limiting the skating season.  Artificial icemaking equipment and  structural insulation  were added in 1997.  Now operated by Deuville's son Ellery, the rink is one of three rinks in the Truro area, the other being the Colchester Legion Stadium.

Hockeyville competition
The CBC Television network began advertising its inaugural season for the Hockeyville contest on January 8, 2006 and local residents of Salmon River persuaded the community to enter the Deuville rink into the competition.  On March 29, Salmon River succeeded in the first round when the community was selected to be in the top 50 out of 450 initial entries.  The list was subsequently narrowed on June 9 when Salmon River was placed in the top 5 communities, competing with Smithers, British Columbia, Airdrie, Alberta, Barry's Bay, Ontario, and Falher, Alberta.  Salmon River won the competition during the final episode on June 11.  The contest resulted in the local community being awarded the right to host an NHL pre-season exhibition game in fall 2006, $10,000 in hockey equipment, and $50,000 from Home Depot to repair the Deuville rink.

References

Communities in Colchester County